General Manuel Bonilla Chirinos (7 June 1849 – 21 March 1913) was a military officer with the rank of Major General and President of Honduras from 13 April 1903 to 25 February 1907, and again from 1 February 1912 to 21 March 1913. He had previously served as Vice President of Honduras from 1895 to 1899.

Manuel Bonilla Chirinos was born in Juticalpa, Olancho, on 7 June 1849. His parents were Jorge Bonilla and María Dominga Chirinos. He was initially liberal and active in the Partido Liberal de Honduras (PLH) and led the Manuelistas to form the right-wing Partido Nacional de Honduras (PNH). As president, he granted generous concessions to United Fruit. During his presidency, the country's schools are said to have improved and the mining industry to have benefited. He commissioned the construction of the Teatro Nacional Manuel Bonilla in the capital Tegucigalpa.

Early Life and Education 

1849 births
1913 deaths
People from Olancho Department
National Party of Honduras politicians
Presidents of Honduras
Vice presidents of Honduras
Liberal Party of Honduras politicians